Myositis is a rare disease that involves inflammation of the muscles. This can present with a variety of symptoms such as skin involvement (i.e., rashes), muscle weakness, and other organ involvement. Systemic symptoms such as weight loss, fatigue, and low fever can also present.

Causes
Injury, medicines, infection, or an autoimmune disorder can lead to myositis. It can also be idiopathic.

 Injury - A mild form of myositis can occur with hard exercise. A more severe form of muscle injury, called rhabdomyolysis, is also associated with myositis. This is a condition where injury to your muscles causes them to quickly break down. 
 Medicines - A variety of different medicines can cause myositis. One of the most common drug types that can cause myositis is statins. Statins are drugs that are used to help lower high cholesterol. One of the most common side effects of statin therapy is muscle pain. Rarely, statin therapy can lead to myositis.
 Infection - The most common infectious cause of myositis is viral infections, such as the common cold. Viruses, such as COVID-19, are also shown to be a rare cause of myositis. Benign acute childhood myositis has been described in children after prodromal viral infections with different viral agents.
 Autoimmune - Autoimmune disease is an abnormal immune response to a functioning body part, in this case the muscles. The three main types of autoimmune myositis are dermatomyositis, polymyositis, and inclusion body myositis. Other autoimmune diseases, such as systemic lupus erythematosus, can also cause myositis-like symptoms.

Diagnosis
There are various tools that can be used to help diagnose myositis. The most common ones are: physical exam, electromyography, magnetic resonance imaging, muscle biopsy, and blood tests.

The first thing your doctor will likely do is perform a physical exam. They will look for various things such as muscle weakness and rashes.

Another possible test is an electromyography (EMG). This is a test that inserts tiny needles into your muscles. This allows a physician to look at your muscles’ response to various electrical nerve signals and evaluate which muscles potentially have myositis.
Magnetic resonance imaging (MRI) is also useful. This is a test that uses a big magnet to create images on a computer. This allows a physician to examine your muscles. It is painless.

Muscle biopsies are the most reliable tests for diagnosing myositis. It will tell your doctor for certain if you have myositis or not.

There are also a variety of blood tests available that help in the diagnoses of myositis. Your doctor may look for elevation of creatine kinase in blood, which is indicative of muscle inflammation. Certain autoantibodies (antibodies that target your muscle cells) can also be found in the blood that can indicate that myositis is caused by an autoimmune disease. Some specific examples of autoantibodies are Anti-Jo-1, Anti-HMGCR, Anti-TIF1, etc.

Treatment
Treatment for myositis depends on the underlying cause. For myositis that is caused by a viral infection, no treatment is typically needed. If it is caused by a bacterial infection, antibiotics can be used. If myositis is being caused by a medication, it is important to stop that medication.

There are a variety of treatment options available if myositis is caused by an autoimmune disease. Glucocorticoids are often the first choice for treatment. This drug works to weaken your immune system so that your immune system is not able to attack your muscles. This is a type of steroid and can cause a wide array of side effects such as mood changes, increased hunger, trouble sleeping, etc. Another treatment option is a steroid-sparing immunosuppressive agent. This works to also weaken your immune system, but does not cause the side effects that the steroids do. Yet another treatment option is a class of drugs called biologics. Also, intravenous immunoglobulins (IVIg) has also been shown to be effective in the treatment of myositis caused by an autoimmune disease.

See also 
 Myopathy (muscle disease)
 Myalgia (muscle pain)
 Masticatory muscle myositis (a disease in dogs)
 Perimyositis

References

External links 
 Myositis: NIH

Myositis Association https://www.myositis.org

Inflammations
Muscular disorders